The MMXXI Tour was the 13th headlining concert tour by American band Maroon 5. It began on August 10, 2021 and ended on December 31, 2021.

Background
On November 11, 2019, Maroon 5 announced the 2020 Tour was revealed, which will take place in Latin America. The band confirmed more additional dates of the tour from November 19 and December 4, 2019, (with North America), respectively. Artists Meghan Trainor and Leon Bridges, were announced as opening acts in the North American leg in the summer. On May 15, 2020, the band announced all dates of North American leg has been postponed, due to the coronavirus pandemic. The rescheduled dates will be billed as the MMXXI Tour. In July 2020, Maroon 5 announced the dates of 2021 Tour, was revealed. This tour in support of the band's seventh studio album Jordi. The previous artists has since been replaced by Blackbear and Ava Max, as new openers to the band's 2021 Tour.

Depending on the state legislature, the event organizer required proof of COVID-19 vaccination or a negative diagnostic test within 48 hours prior to entry in addition to wearing a mask in order to attend Maroon 5's show.

Shows

Cancelled dates

Accolades

References

Notes

Citations 

2021 concert tours
Maroon 5 concert tours
Concert tours of North America
Concert tours of Canada
Concert tours of the United States
Concert tours postponed due to the COVID-19 pandemic